Constantine Phipps may refer to:

 Constantine Phipps (Lord Chancellor of Ireland) (1656–1723)
 Constantine Phipps, 1st Baron Mulgrave (1722–1775)
 Constantine Phipps, 2nd Baron Mulgrave (1744–1792)
 Constantine Phipps, 1st Marquess of Normanby (1797–1863)
 Constantine Phipps, 3rd Marquess of Normanby (1846–1932)
 Constantine Phipps, 5th Marquess of Normanby (born 1954)
 Sir Constantine Phipps (diplomat) (1840–1911)